Vanna Brosio (18 April 1943 – 19 June 2010) was an Italian singer, television personality and journalist.

Life and career 
Born Giovanna Brosio  in Turin, the daughter of a well-known antiquarian and the niece of the former NATO Secretary General Manlio Brosio, she started her career in 1948 as a model in Milan, appearing in magazines, fotoromanzi and Carosello commercials. In 1964  she started a more than twenty years musical career during which she recorded songs written for her by Enzo Jannacci, Cristiano Malgioglio and Gianni Boncompagni, among others. In 1971 she hosted the radio program Novità, and between 1972 and 1976 she hosted the RAI musical show Adesso musica. In 1984 she co-presented, alongside Aldo Biscardi, the sport talk-show Il processo del Lunedì. In addition to her musical and television activities, Brosio was also active as a journalist, collaborating for years with the magazine TV Sorrisi e Canzoni.

Filmography

References

External links 

 Vanna Brosio at Discogs

Musicians from Turin
1943 births
Italian film actresses
2010 deaths
Italian pop singers
Italian radio presenters
Italian journalists
Italian women journalists
20th-century Italian women singers
Italian women radio presenters
Italian women television presenters
Mass media people from Turin